The Visit Permit for Residents of Macao to HKSAR (Traditional Chinese: 澳門居民往來香港特別行政區旅遊證; Portuguese: Título de Visita de Residentes de Macau à RAEHK) is a travel document used by eligible Macau residents to enter Hong Kong. It is valid for seven years, and allows the holder to make multiple visits to Hong Kong, each time for up to 180 days (for permanent residents of Macau) and up to thirty days (for non-permanent residents of Macau) for pleasure or business without the need to apply for visas or entry permits.

A Declaration Form for Holders of the Macau SAR Permanent Resident Identity Card to Hong Kong SAR is not needed if entering Hong Kong using this travel document.

Eligibility
A Chinese or Portuguese citizen
Resident of Macau SAR
Holder of Macau SAR Permanent Resident Identity Card or Macau SAR Non-Permanent Resident Identity Card

References

External links
 Macau SAR Identification Department's information page on the Visit Permit for Residents of Macau SAR to Hong Kong SAR

Chinese passports
Identity documents
Government of Hong Kong
Government of Macau
Macau society
Tourism in Hong Kong